José do Carmo Souza, also known as Zé do Carmo (Goiana, 19 November 1933 – Goiana, 26 April 2019) was a Brazilian ceramist. He began to work with clay in 1941, when he was 7 years old, and was considered from 2002 until his death in 2019 a Living Heritage of Pernambuco.

Biography 
In the year 1980, he, at the request of Dom Hélder Câmara, created a sculpture to be handed over to Pope John Paul II. But Câmara did not approve the sculpture, of an angel with cangaceiro face, saying that that image was profane. The piece was then vetoed and never reached the hands of the Pope, and today, in memoriam, it is in the city of Goiana, in Zé do Carmo's studio.

Zé do Carmo died on April 26, 2019 during hospitalization at the Belarmino Correia hospital, due to a cardiac arrest resulting from lung problems that he had been fighting for 10 years.

References

External links 

 Em Nome do Autor – Artistas Artesãos do Brasil 

1933 births
2019 deaths
People from Pernambuco
Brazilian ceramists
Brazilian male artists
20th-century Brazilian artists
20th-century Brazilian male artists
20th-century ceramists
21st-century Brazilian artists
21st-century ceramists